Provencher is a federal electoral district in Manitoba, Canada, that has been represented in the House of Commons of Canada since 1871. It is a largely rural district in the province's southeast corner. Its largest community is the city of Steinbach.

Geography

The district is in the most southeastern part of Manitoba.

Demographics
According to the Canada 2011 Census

Ethnic groups: 85.3% White, 12.3% Aboriginal
Languages: 67.7% English, 17.3% German, 10.5% French, 1.2% Russian, 1.1% Ukrainian
Religions: 79.6% Christian (35.8% "Other Christian", 23.6% Catholic, 6.3% United Church, 4.8% Lutheran, 2.5% Anglican, 2.2% Baptist), 19.5% None. 
Median income: $29,184 (2010)
Average income: $36,186 (2010)

History

The electoral district was created in 1871, and was one of the four original ridings allocated to Manitoba when it joined the Canadian Confederation in 1870. It is notable for being the riding that elected Louis Riel to the House of Commons as an independent.

Through its history the riding has alternated between representation by the Liberals and Progressive Conservatives (or Conservative Party of Canada).

This riding lost territory to Selkirk—Interlake—Eastman and Portage—Lisgar, and gained territory from Selkirk—Interlake during the 2012 electoral redistribution.

Members of Parliament

This riding has elected the following Members of Parliament:

Election results

Minister of Public Safety Vic Toews resigned from cabinet and as an MP, effective 9 July 2013, to spend more time with his family and join the private sector.

Note: Conservative vote is compared to the total of the Canadian Alliance vote and Progressive Conservative vote in 2000 election.

Note: Canadian Alliance vote is compared to the Reform vote in 1997 election.

See also
 List of Canadian federal electoral districts
 Past Canadian electoral districts

References

Notes

External links
 
 Expenditures – 2008
Expenditures – 2004
Expenditures – 2000
Expenditures – 1997

Manitoba federal electoral districts
Steinbach, Manitoba
1871 establishments in Manitoba